New World crops are those crops, food and otherwise, that were native to the New World (mostly the Americas) before 1492 AD and not found in the Old World before that time. Many of these crops are now grown around the world and have often become an integral part of the cuisine of various cultures in the Old World. Notable among these crops are the Three Sisters: maize, winter squash, and climbing beans.

List of crops

Timeline of cultivation
The new world developed agriculture by at least 8000 BC. The following table shows when each New World crop was first domesticated.

Dissemination to the Old World

The transfer of people, crops, precious metals, and diseases from the Old World to the New World and vice versa is called the Columbian Exchange.

Food historian Lois Ellen Frank calls potatoes, tomatoes, corn, beans, squash, chili, cacao, and vanilla the "magic eight" ingredients that were found and used only in the Americas before 1492 and were taken via the Columbian Exchange back to the Old World, dramatically transforming the cuisine there. According to Frank,

See also

 First agricultural revolution
 List of food plants native to the Americas
 Neolithic founder crops
 Timeline of agriculture and food technology

References

History of agriculture